2-Dimethylaminoethylazide (DMAZ) is a liquid rocket fuel being investigated for use as a spacecraft propellent to replace the toxic, carcinogenic monomethylhydrazine. It is a member of the competitive impulse non-carcinogenic hypergol (CINCH) family which were assessed as a replacement for hydrazine-derived propellants. DMAZ was also found to be sensitive to impact, direct flame, shock wave, heat in confined space, and electrostatic discharge.

Formation and reactions

DMAZ is an organic azide, which is prepared by reacting the chloride of the corresponding alkyl-amine (in this case ethylamine) with sodium azide:

Ideally, the complete combustion of DMAZ produces carbon dioxide, water, and nitrogen:

Ignition delays
During their inquiry into finding alternative hypergolic fuel, a joint effort by the Aviation and Missile Research, Development, and Engineering Center (AMRDEC), the U.S. Army Research Laboratory (ARL), and the National Aeronautics and Space Administration (NASA) determined that DMAZ could perform competitively with Aerozine-50 and is less toxic than hydrazine-based fuels. However, DMAZ-inhibited red fuming nitric acid (IRFNA) systems have demonstrated longer ignition delays than monomethylhydrazine-IRFNA systems. In an effort to address this issue, researchers synthesized the related compounds 2-azidoethanamines – 2-azido-N-methylethanamine (MMAZ) and 2-azido-N-cyclopropylethanamine (CPAZ) in hopes of enhancing the reactivity of DMAZ's amine nitrogen to reduce ignition delays. MMAZ is not hypergolic, while CPAZ is hypergolic.

According to research conducted by Army Research Laboratory, the azido group in DMAZ's lowest energy structure will prevent the transfer of protons from nitric acid to the amine lone pair acid, a chemical reaction that may be associated with a rate-limiting step in DMAZ-IRFNA ignition.

However, according to a 2014 ARL report, a correlation between compound basicities and ignition delays was not observed, which indicates that the proton transfer from nitric acid to DMAZ's amine may not be a rate-controlling step in the ignition process of DMAZ-IRFNA systems.

References

Rocket fuels
Organoazides
Dimethylamino compounds